Arthur L. Lobel (born c. 1935) is a Canadian curler from Montreal, Quebec. He was the third of the 1977 Brier Champion team, representing Quebec. He is a member of the Canadian Curling Hall of Fame.

Lobel moved to Thornhill in about 1978.

He also won six Ontario Senior Championships (1986, 1989, 1992, 1994, 1998 and 1999), three Canadian Senior Curling Championships (1986, 1989, 1992), and the 2000 Canadian Masters Curling Championships.

Lobel was an engineer with CIL.

References

External links

 Arthur Lobel – Curling Canada Stats Archive

Brier champions
Living people
1930s births
Curlers from Quebec
Canadian male curlers
Engineers from Quebec
People from Virden, Manitoba
Sportspeople from Montreal
Curlers from Ontario
People from Thornhill, Ontario